The Minister of Public Works is a senior member of the Constitutional Government of East Timor heading the Ministry of Public Works.

Functions
Under the Constitution of East Timor, the Minister has the power and the duty:

Where the Minister is in charge of the subject matter of a government statute, the Minister is also required, together with the Prime Minister, to sign the statute.

Incumbent
He is assisted by Nicolau Lino Freitas Belo, Deputy Minister of Public Works.

List of Ministers 
The following individuals have been appointed as the Minister:

References

Footnote

Notes

External links
  – official site

Public Works